This is a list of rugby league footballers who have played first grade for the Adelaide Rams. Players are listed in the order they made their debut.

These lists encompass player records from the:
 Super League competition, 1997.
 World Club Challenge competition, 1997.
 National Rugby League competition, 1998.

List of players

†Full team list not available for WCC matches against Oldham on 20 June 1997 or 25 July 1997, or against Leeds on 18 July 1997 or Salford on 3 August 1997 but this player scored in one or more of these matches and so is awarded an appearance for that match.

External links
 rugbyleagueproject.org

References

Lists of Australian rugby league players
 
National Rugby League lists
Adelaide-related lists